SEMCORP Group, formally Yunnan Energy New Material Co. Ltd., is a multinational corporation headquartered in China that specializes in the development and manufacture of advanced materials. It is the world’s largest producer of lithium-ion battery separator film by volume, and is a major supplier to global electric vehicle battery makers including LG Chem, CATL, BYD, and Samsung SDI. Its other products include printing packages, packing boxes, liquid wrapping papers, high-grade wrapping papers, biaxially oriented polypropylene films and other related products. SEMCORP Group is listed on the Shenzhen Stock Exchange (ticker: 002812.SZ).

History 
SEMCORP Group was founded by brothers Paul Xiaoming Lee and Tony Xiaohua Li. Lee and Li studied and worked in the United States in the late 1980s and early 1990s, and returned to China in 1996 to start their business. Their first business was the manufacture of cigarette labels and packages.

In 2019, SEMCORP Group overtook Asahi Kasei to become the largest supplier of lithium-ion battery separator film in the world.

In November 2019, SEMCORP Group announced a licensing deal with Teijin Ltd., a global leader in coating technology, for the manufacture of coated separators.

In November 2020, SEMCORP Group announced its first overseas facility to manufacture lithium-ion battery separator film in Debrecen, Hungary.

In January 2021, SEMCORP Group announced its first international joint venture with U.S.-based Polypore International, LP to manufacture dry-process separator film in China.

In August 2021, SEMCORP Group and Chinese battery maker EVE announced a joint venture to manufacture lithium-ion battery separator film in China.

In May 2022, SEMCORP Group announced its first North American facility to manufacture lithium-ion battery separator film in Sidney, Ohio.

References 

Multinational companies headquartered in China